Pickin' on Nashville is the debut studio album by American country rock/southern rock band The Kentucky Headhunters. It features the singles "Walk Softly on This Heart of Mine", "Oh Lonesome Me", "Dumas Walker", and "Rock 'n' Roll Angel", all of which charted in the Top 40 on the Hot Country Songs charts. "Oh Lonesome Me" was also the highest charting, at #8. The album won a Grammy Award for Best Country Performance by a Duo or Group with Vocal for the band in 1991.

"Walk Softly on This Heart of Mine" is a cover of a Bill Monroe song, "Skip a Rope" a cover of a Henson Cargill song, and "Oh Lonesome Me" a cover of a Don Gibson song. After brothers Ricky Lee and Doug Phelps left the band in 1992 to form the duo Brother Phelps, they recorded "Ragtop" on their second album (1994's Any Way the Wind Blows). Doug rejoined the band in 1997.

Track listing

Personnel
The Kentucky Headhunters
Greg Martin - lead guitar
Doug Phelps - background vocals, bass guitar
Ricky Lee Phelps - lead vocals
Fred Young - drums, percussion
Richard Young - rhythm guitar

Additional musician
Richard Ripani - Hammond B-3 organ on "Oh Lonesome Me", "cheesy organ" on "Rock 'n' Roll Angel"

Technical
Mike Bradley - recording, mixing
The Kentucky Headhunters - production, arrangement
Glenn Meadows - mastering
Jim Zumwalt - executive production

Chart performance

Weekly charts

Year-end charts

Certifications

References

1989 debut albums
The Kentucky Headhunters albums
Mercury Nashville albums